Gray Horse is an unincorporated community in Osage County, Oklahoma, United States. The post office was established May 5, 1890, and discontinued December 31, 1931. It was named for Gray Horse (Ko-wah-hos-tsa), an Osage medicine man.

Gray Horse and the surrounding towns of Fairfax and Pawhuska feature prominently in the Osage Murders, which took place in the early 1920s. The towns had grown exceedingly wealthy due to the discovery and drilling of nearby oil fields, and the resident Osage tribe members began to live lifestyles that befitted their newly acquired economic status. This time period and the circumstances and effects of the murders on the community of Gray Horse have been documented in David Grann's 2017 book Killers of the Flower Moon: The Osage Murders and the Birth of the FBI.

References

External links

Unincorporated communities in Osage County, Oklahoma
Unincorporated communities in Oklahoma